The 2015 Florida A&M Rattlers football team represented Florida A&M University in the 2015 NCAA Division I FCS football season. The Rattlers were led by first-year head coach Alex Wood. They played their home games at Bragg Memorial Stadium. They were a member of the Mid-Eastern Athletic Conference (MEAC). They finished the season 1–10, 1–7 in MEAC play to finish in a four way tie for eighth place.  The Rattlers were ineligible to participate in post season play to due Academic Progress Rate violations.

Schedule

 Source: Schedule

Game summaries

@ South Florida

@ Samford

@ South Carolina State

Tennessee State

@ Savannah State

North Carolina Central

Delaware State

North Carolina A&T

@ Hampton

@ Morgan State

vs Bethune-Cookman

References

Florida AandM
Florida A&M Rattlers football seasons
Florida AandM Rattlers football